The 2019 Bayelsa State gubernatorial election occurred on 16 November 2019, the APC nominee David Lyon won the election, defeating Douye Diri of the PDP.

David Lyon emerged APC gubernatorial candidate after defeating his closest rival, Diseye Nsirim. He picked Biobarakuma Degi as his running mate. Douye Diri was the PDP candidate with Lawrence Ewrujakpor as his running mate. 45 candidates contested in the election.

Electoral system
The Governor of Bayelsa State is elected using the plurality voting system.

Primary election

APC primary
The APC primary election was held on 4 September 2019. David Lyon won the primary election polling 42,138 votes against 5 other candidates. His closest rival was Diseye Nsirim, who came a distant second with 1,533 votes.

Candidates
Party nominee: David Lyon: businessman
Running mate: Biobarakuma Degi: Nigerian senator
Heineken Lokpobiri: former Nigerian senator
Preye Aganaba
Prince Amgbare
Maureen Etebu

PDP primary
The PDP primary election was held on September 3, 2019. Douye Diri won the primary election polling 561 votes against 20 other candidates. His closest rival was Timi Alaibe, a former managing director of the Niger Delta Development Commission, who came second with 365 votes, Gboribiogha Jonah, the incumbent deputy governor, scored 62 votes.

Candidates
Party nominee: Douye Diri: Nigerian senator
Running mate: Lawrence Ewrujakpor: Nigerian senator
Timi Alaibe: former managing director of the Niger Delta Development Commission
Gboribiogha Jonah: incumbent deputy governor

Results
A total number of 45 candidates registered with the Independent National Electoral Commission to contest in the election.

The total number of registered voters in the state was 922,562, while 517,883 voters were accredited. Total number of votes cast was 505,884, while number of valid votes was 499,551. Rejected votes were 6,333.

By local government area
Here are the results of the election by local government area for the two major parties. The total valid votes of 499,551 represents the 45 political parties that participated in the election. Blue represents LGAs won by David Lyon. Green represents LGAs won by Douye Diri.

References 

Bayelsa
Bayelsa State gubernatorial election
gubernatorial
Bayelsa State gubernatorial elections